Pridoli (Přídolí) may refer to:

Pridoli epoch, part of the Silurian period
Přídolí, a small town in the southern Czech Republic
 Pridoli (Bajina Bašta), a village in Serbia